Among all sport in Turkey, the most popular one is football. Turkey's top teams include Fenerbahçe, Galatasaray and Beşiktaş. In 2000, Galatasaray won the UEFA Cup and UEFA Super Cup. Two years later, the Turkish national team finished third in the 2002 FIFA World Cup Finals in Japan and South Korea, while in 2008, the national team reached the semi-finals of the UEFA Euro 2008 competition. The Atatürk Olympic Stadium in Istanbul hosted the 2005 UEFA Champions League Final, while the Şükrü Saracoğlu Stadium in Istanbul hosted the 2009 UEFA Cup Final.

Other popular mainstream sports include basketball and volleyball. Turkey hosted the Finals of EuroBasket 2001 and the 2010 FIBA World Cup the men's national team finishing second in both events. The national team also reached the quarter-finals of the 2006 FIBA World Cup, and 2014 FIBA World Cup.  At the club level, Anadolu Efes (then known as Efes Pilsen) won the FIBA Korać Cup in 1996, finished second in the FIBA Saporta Cup in 1993, and made it to the Final Four of the EuroLeague in 2000 and 2001 as the first Turkish club in history. In the following years, Beşiktaş have come out as the winners of the FIBA EuroChallenge in the 2011–12 season with only a single defeat, all stages of the tournament included. Later on, Galatasaray won the EuroCup title in 2016. In the following 2016–17 Euroleague season, Fenerbahçe won Europe's highest-tier basketball league, the EuroLeague, as the first Turkish club ever, which was followed by Anadolu Efes in the 2020–21 Euroleague season. Turkish basketball players such as Mehmet Okur, Hidayet Türkoğlu and Ersan İlyasova have also been successful in the NBA. Active Turkish NBA players include Cedi Osman, Furkan Korkmaz, Enes Kanter, and Ersan Ilyasova.

Women's volleyball teams, namely Fenerbahçe, Eczacıbaşı and Vakıfbank, have won numerous European championship titles and medals. Vakıfbank is currently one of the best volleyball teams in the world, 3 time winner of the Club World Championship and 4 time European championship winner. The yellow-black team is also the most successful sports team of Turkey in International arena with the title of the most international trophy (9) holder of Turkey. Fenerbahçe also won the Club World Championship as the first Turkish club ever in 2010. Turkey Women's National Basketball team won the silver medal in the European Championship in 2011 while the Women's National Volleyball Team reached the 6th place in the World Championship in 2010 and won a bronze medal in European Championship in 2011.

Turkish athletes recently achieved success in European level; Elvan Abeylegesse winning gold medal in Women's 10000 metres and silver in Women's 5000 metres, Alemitu Bekele winning gold medal in Women's 5000 metres and Nevin Yanıt winning gold medal in Women's 100 metres Hurdl in 2010 European Championship. In 2011 European Athletics Indoor Championships Kemal Koyuncu won silver in Men's 1500 metres and Halil Akkas won bronze in Men's 3000 metres.

The traditional Turkish national sport has been the oil wrestling ("Yağlı güreş") since Ottoman times. Edirne hosts the annual Kırkpınar oiled wrestling tournament since 1361. International wrestling styles governed by FILA such as Freestyle wrestling and Greco-Roman wrestling are also popular, with many European, World and Olympic championship titles won by Turkish wrestlers both individually and as a national team. Another major sport in which the Turks have been internationally successful is weightlifting.

Football

Turkey has risen to prominence in a number of sporting areas in recent decades. Football has seen a rapid transformation earning it third place in the coveted 2002 FIFA World Cup. Its domestic teams are dominated by Beşiktaş, Fenerbahçe, and Galatasaray. Of these, Fenerbahçe's European triumph came in the now defunct Balkans Cup in 1968. Galatasaray has seen success after the 1990s, winning the 2000 UEFA Cup and UEFA Super Cup. In recent years, Turkey has exported many of its players into top foreign teams, including Internazionale, FC Barcelona, Parma, Milan, and Bayern Munich, among others. As well as sending players abroad, the Turkish league has also attracted players into Turkey. World class players such as Pierre van Hooijdonk, Mário Jardel, Nicolas Anelka, John Carew, Milan Baroš, Radomir Antić, Óscar Córdoba, Lincoln, Mateja Kežman, Kleberson, Roberto Carlos, Zoran Simović, Frank de Boer, Giovani dos Santos, Franck Ribéry, Harry Kewell, Dani Güiza, Guti, Quaresma, Gheorghe Hagi, Jô, Abdul Kader Keita, Shabani Nonda, Lucas Neill, Lorik Cana, Giga Popescu, Jérôme Rothen and many more have played at some point or continue to play in Turkey.

Basketball

Basketball is also gaining popularity in Turkey. Turkey came in second at the European Basketball Championship 2001 in Istanbul. Turkey also came in ninth at the 2002 FIBA World Cup. Several Turkish nationals, including Ersan İlyasova, Hedo Türkoğlu, Mehmet Okur, Semih Erden, Ömer Aşık, and Enes Kanter, have played in the prestigious National Basketball Association, generally considered the world's top basketball league. Turkey's greatest success in international basketball came when it hosted the 2010 FIBA World Cup, finishing second behind the USA. Hedo Turkoglu captained the national side and made the all-tournament team. Turkey also advanced to the quarter-finals in the 2006 FIBA World Cup, achieving a non-expected sixth place. Turkey reached the quarter-finals again eight years later at the 2014 FIBA World Cup. The Turkey women's national basketball team won the silver medal at the EuroBasket Women in 2011. 

At a club level, the most successful team has been Fenerbahçe S.K. and Anadolu Efes S.K., the latter having won the FIBA Korać Cup in 1996 and the Euroleague in 2021 and 2022. Fenerbahce currently has the most Euroleague Final Four appearances (5) and was the first Turkish team to win the title in the 2016–17 season. Galatasaray won the EuroCup title, Europe's second-tier basketball league, in 2016. Past achievements also include Besiktas' FIBA EuroChallenge title in the 2012. In women's basketball, Galatasaray won the 2008-09 FIBA EuroCup, finished third in the same competition in 2007-08, and also was runner-up in the 2009 FIBA Europe SuperCup Women.

Volleyball
Volleyball, especially women's volleyball is a popular sport in Turkey. Recently Turkey women's national volleyball team secured 6th place at the FIVB Volleyball Women's World Championship in 2010 in Japan, and won a bronze medal at the Women's European Volleyball Championship in 2011 in Serbia. Turkey's top women's volleyball team is Vakıfbank, which have won undefeated 3 Championships at the FIVB Volleyball Women's Club World Championship in 2013,2017 and 2018. 5 Championship undefeated at the CEV Women's Champions League in 2011,2013,2017,2018 and 2022 season and the gold medal in both Challenge Cup and Women's Top Volley International in the 2007-08 season. Another prominent Turkish women's volleyball club is Fenerbahçe, which have won the FIVB Volleyball Women's Club World Championship undefeated in 2010, the silver medal in the CEV Women's Champions League in the 2009-10 season and finishing in third place during the 2010-11 season.

Turkey featured a men's national team in beach volleyball that competed at the 2018–2020 CEV Beach Volleyball Continental Cup.

Handball
Yeliz Özel from Ankara is a Turkish handballer considered to be one of the world's best playmakers from women's handball of its time.

Athletics

Athletics is another fast improving sport. Süreyya Ayhan set the 1500m world record in 2003 and Elvan Abeylegesse set a new 5000m record in 2004. In 2010 European Athletics Championships Alemitu Bekele and Elvan Abeylegesse won gold and silver medals respectively in Women's 5000 metres and Elvan Abeylegesse also won gold medal in Women's 10000 metres. Nevin Yanıt won first European Championship in a sprint race for Turkey by winning gold in Women's 100 metres hurdles. In 2011 European Athletics Indoor Championships Kemal Koyuncu won silver in Men's 1500 metres and Halil Akkas won bronze in Men's 3000 metres. In 2017, Ramil Guliyev of Fenerbahçe won Turkey's first ever gold medal in the men's 200 metre race at the 2017 World Championships, being the second white athlete in history to achieve this feat.

Beach handball
2010 Beach Handball World Championships were held between June 23–27 in Antalya. The Turkish national team won twice the silver medal at the World Championships in 2004 and 2006, and the bronze medal in 2010. The Turkish women's national team also won the silver medal at the 2004 World Championships.

Fencing
Turkey hosted the 2009 World Fencing Championships held from September 30 to October 8 in Antalya.

Fishing
Fishing cannot be done from any boat without a license, even if you're an amateur. You must apply to have one by submitting some I.D. cards and paying a fee 150 Turkish Lira for two years. Details concerning fishing zones, the minimum sizes of fish that can be caught, and the numbers of fish that can be caught per person can be obtained from the Department of Fisheries at the Ministry of Agriculture and Rural Affairs. Aegean and Mediterranean seas are rich fishing areas.

Flying

Plane gliding, hang gliding, parachuting, paragliding and single engine flights are catered for as well as services that provide instruction courses. Best areas are Fethiye, Eskişehir, Pamukkale, and Istanbul.

Motorsports
Motorsports have become popular recently, especially following the inclusion of the Rally of Turkey to the FIA World Rally Championship calendar in 2003, and the inclusion of the Turkish Grand Prix to the Formula One racing calendar in 2005. Other important annual motorsports events which are held at the Istanbul Park racing circuit include the MotoGP Grand Prix of Turkey, the FIA World Touring Car Championship, the GP2 Series and the Le Mans Series. From time to time, Istanbul and Antalya also host the Turkish leg of the F1 Powerboat Racing championship; while the Turkish leg of the Red Bull Air Race World Series, an air racing competition, takes place above the Golden Horn in Istanbul. Surfing, snowboarding, skateboarding, paragliding and other extreme sports are becoming more popular every year.

The track located at Istanbul has a seating capacity of 155,000 people (biggest in Europe), is just over 5,340 m long and  runs anti-clockwise. The track was designed by Hermann Tilke, designer of the Sepang, Bahrain and Shanghai tracks.
GP2 series also include a Turkish Team (Petrol Ofisi FMS International) and a Turkish Driver, Jason Tahincioglu.

Kenan Sofuoğlu became world champion in Supersport three times in 2007, 2010, and 2012.

Rafting
Turkey's rivers provide perfect conditions for canoeing and rafting, for both beginners and experienced. Some of the best rivers for rafting are Çoruh, Barhal, Berta, Fırtına, Çolaklı, Köprüçay, Manavgat, Dragon, Göksu (Silifke), Zamanti, Göksu (Feke), Kızılırmak, and Dalaman Çayı.

Rugby league
Rugby League is a relatively new sport in Turkey, so far five clubs make up the rugby league in Turkey, observer status within the Rugby League European Federation is expected within a few months.

Rugby union

Sailing and boat trips
Turkey has four bordering seas; the Black Sea, Marmara Sea, Aegean Sea, and Mediterranean Sea, so it not surprising that cruising is a popular sport. There are many cruising charters available. Gulets are traditional motor yachts and gulet holidays are becoming increasingly popular.

Taekwondo

Weightlifting
Weightlifting has been another successful sport for Turkey, regularly relied upon to provide gold medals in the Olympics. Its most famous weightlifters, Naim Süleymanoğlu and Halil Mutlu, are only two of four weightlifters in the world to have won three gold medals in three Olympics, and among women Nurcan Taylan broke one world record.

Windsurfing
The bays around Çeşme, Alaçatı, Bodrum, and Datça peninsulas as well as Antalya have ideal wind conditions for windsurfing. Famous windsurfer Çağla Kubat is also from Turkey.

Wrestling

See also
List of sports governing bodies in Turkey
Oil wrestling (Yağlı güreş)
List of Turkish sportspeople

References

External links
Sport in Turkey